Anadenanthera colubrina (also known as vilca, huilco, huilca, wilco, willka, curupay,  curupau, cebil, or angico) is a South American tree closely related to yopo, or Anadenanthera peregrina. In Argentina, A. colubrina produces flowers from September to December and bean pods from September to July. In Brazil A. colubrina has been given "high priority" conservation status.

Nomenclature 
Anadenanthera colubrina is known by many names throughout South America. In Peru it is known as willka (also spelled wilca, vilca and huilca) which in the Quechua languages means "sacred".

Geography 
A. colubrina is found in Argentina, Bolivia, Brazil, Ecuador, Paraguay, Peru, Cuba, and Mauritius.

Natural growing conditions 

It tends to grow on rocky hillsides in well-drained soil, often in the vicinity of rivers. The growing areas are often "savannah to dry rainforest." Flowering can begin in as soon as two years after germination.

General uses

Food 
A sweetened drink is made from the bark.

Gum
Gum from the tree can be used in the same way as gum arabic.

Tannin 
A. colubrina's tannin is used in industry to process animal hides.

Entheogen
The beans of A. colubrina are used to make a snuff called vilca (sometimes called cebil).  The bean pods are roasted to facilitate removal of the husk, followed by grinding with a mortar and pestle into a powder and mixed with a natural form of calcium hydroxide (lime) or calcium oxide.  The main active constituent of vilca is bufotenin; to a much lesser degree DMT and 5-MeO-DMT are also present. A. colubrina has been found to contain up to 12.4% bufotenin.

It is also believed that the ground beans were used as a snuff by the Tiwanaku.  There have been reports of active use of vilca by Wichi shamans, under the name hatáj.

Between 2013 and 2017, archaeological excavations at the Quilcapampa site in southern Peru, found that the Wari used seeds from the vilca tree and combined the hallucinogenic drug with chicha, or beer made from the molle tree.

Traditional medicine 

The tree's bark is the most common part used medicinally.  Gum from the tree is used medicinally to treat upper respiratory tract infections, as an expectorant and otherwise for cough.

Archaeological evidence shows Anadenanthera colubrina beans have been used as hallucinogens for thousands of years. The oldest clear evidence of use comes from pipes made of puma bone (Felis concolor) found with A. colubrina beans at Inca Cueva, a site in the Humahuaca gorge at the edge of the Puna of Jujuy Province, Argentina. The pipes were found to contain the hallucinogen DMT, one of the compounds found in Anadenanthera beans. Radiocarbon testing of the material gave a date of 2130 BC, suggesting that Anadenanthera use as a hallucinogen is over 4,000 years old. Snuff trays and tubes were found in the central Peruvian coast dating back to 1200 BC. Archaeological evidence of insufflation use within the period 500-1000 AD, in northern Chile, has been reported.

Wood 

In northeastern Brazil, the tree is primarily used as timber and for making wooden implements.  "It is used in construction and for making door
and window frames, barrels, mooring masts, hedges, platforms, floors,
agricultural implements and railway sleepers."
The wood is also reportedly a preferred source of cooking fuel, since it makes a hot and long-lasting fire.  It is widely used there in the making of fences, since termites seem not to like it.  At one time, it was used in the construction of houses, but people are finding it more difficult to find suitable trees for that purpose.

Chemical compounds 

Chemical compounds contained in A. colubrina include:
	 	
 2,9-dimethyltryptoline – plant
 2-methyltryptoline – plant
 5-MeO-DMT – bark
 5-Methoxy-N-methyltryptamine – bark
 Bufotenin – plant beans
 Bufotenin-oxide – fruit, beans
 Catechol – plant
 Leucoanthocyanin – plant
 Leucopelargonidol – plant
 DMT – fruit, beans, pods, bark
 DMT-oxide – fruit
 Methyltryptamine – bark
 Orientin – leaf
 Saponarentin – leaf
 Viterine – leaf

The bark and leaves contain tannin and the beans contain saponin.

Botanical varieties 
Anadenanthera colubrina (Vell.Conc.)Brenan var. cebil (Griseb.)Altschul
Anadenanthera colubrina (Vell.Conc.)Brenan var. colubrina

See also 

 Hamilton's Pharmacopeia

References

References

Further reading

External links

Anadenanthera colubrina Specimens Click View Med (www.fieldmusem.org)
Anadenanthera colubrina Photo
 Anadenanthera colubrina

colubrina
Entheogens
Trees of Brazil
Herbal and fungal hallucinogens
Psychedelic tryptamine carriers
Medicinal plants of South America
Trees of Bolivia
Trees of Argentina
Plants described in 1831